Prince Yuhara (湯原王 Yuhara-ō or Yuhara no Ōkimi) was a Japanese imperial prince and waka poet of the Nara period. He was a grandson of Emperor Tenji and a brother of Emperor Kōnin, but the details of his life, including his birth and death dates, are unknown.

He was active in poetic composition in the 730s, and 19 of his poems were included in the Man'yōshū. He was probably a significant influence on the other poets of the Tenpyō era, including Ōtomo no Yakamochi.

Life 
Prince Yuhara's year of birth is unknown. He was a son of Prince Shiki (施基皇子 or 志貴皇子), who in turn was a son of Emperor Tenji. On the accession of his brother Prince Shirakabe to throne as Emperor Kōnin in 770 he was given the title shinnō, but the details of his career are not well known.

, who died in 805 in his early 70s, was his second child. He was also an uncle of Prince Aki, who composed Man'yōshū 506 to 508.

His year of death is unknown.

Poetry 
19 of his tanka; have survived in the Man'yōshū. These poems were probably composed in the early Tenpyō era (729–749), a conclusion arrived at based on the ordering of the poems.

His poetry has been noted for its elegant description of natural scenery.

Edwin A. Cranston compared this poem to the poem Prince Yuhara's father composed on the twilight in the reeds at Naniwa (MYS I : 64).

He also composed banquet songs, like the following:
蜻蛉羽の
袖振る妹を
玉匣
奥に思ふを
見給へあが君

His ''sōmon'' romantic exchanges with "a young woman" show his spontaneity and wit as a poet.

Along with Ōtomo no Sakanoue no Iratsume, he was one of the poets who introduced the new poetic style of the Tenpyō era, and exerted some influence on the poetry of Ōtomo no Yakamochi.

References

Works cited 
 
 
 
 

Japanese princes